Cananea is a municipality in the northern portion of the Mexican state of Sonora, on the U.S. border.

Population
The population of the municipality of Cananea was 35,892. Most of the population lives in the municipal seat, which had 31,560 inhabitants. This represented over 95.8% of the total.

Population in 1980: 25,327
Population in 1990: 26,931
Population in 2000: 32,061
Population in 2010: 32,936

Towns and villages
The largest localities (cities, towns, and villages) are:

History
The territory now occupied by the municipality was originally a rancheria inhabited by the Pima Indians, who had been pacified by the Spanish in the seventeenth century.

According to local information, the word Cananea comes from two Apache words: “can” which means "meat" and  “efa”  which means "horse".

The colonial development of Cananea was influenced gby the nearby missions of Arizpe, Santa María and Cocóspera.  In the middle of the nineteenth century Cananea became part of the province of Sonora, becoming a "real de minas".  On 8 November 1901, Cananea was raised to municipal status, after having been part of the municipality of Fronteras.

In 1906 the site was stage to perhaps the most famous strike in Mexican history, the "huelga de Cananea".  This strike was against the American owned mining company and was put down by forces brought across the border from the United States with considerable loss of life on the part of the striking miners.  This strike is considered to be one of the precursors to the Mexican Revolution of 1910.

Cananea became a municipality in 1901.  In 1937 the territory of Naco separated and it became municipality of Naco.  On 31 October 2001, the city of Cananea temporarily became the capital of the state of Sonora during the celebrations of the 100th anniversary of the municipality.

Geography
This municipio borders Cochise County, Arizona, in the United States to the north, and the municipalities of Arizpe (south), Naco and Bacoachi (east) and Ímuris and Santa Cruz (west). Its total area is 4,414.1  square kilometers  and its average elevation is 1,500 meters above sea level.

In addition to the municipal seat there are several small communities: ejido Morelos, Emiliano Zapata, Zaragoza and Vicente.

Cananea has a relatively high altitude.  The most important mountain peaks are  Manzanal, Los Ajos, Cananeita, Magallanes, Azul and la Mariquita (2,480 m), which is the site of the Guillermo Haro Observatory, an astronomical observatory of the National Autonomous University of Mexico (UNAM).

The most important rivers are: Sonora, Bacanuchi and San Pedro; other streams are: Jaralito, Río Claro, Santa Bárbara, Los Difuntos, El Sauz, El Berrendo, El Álamo, Villa Verde, El Chiflón, Cuitaca, Cocóspera, El Anillo and San Antonio.

There were 34 wells (2000), of which 20 were for irrigation, 11 for water supply for the Compañía Minera de Cananea,  and four  for drinking water for Cananea and ejido Zaragoza.

The climate is semihot subhumid with an average monthly maximum temperature  of 23.5 °C in the months of June to September and an average monthly minimum temperature of 7.4 °C in December and January; the average annual temperature is 15.3 °C.

The vegetation is pasture in almost all of the area, while there are still stands of oak pine in the higher elevations.  The areas that can be irrigated are scarce.

Adjacent municipalities and counties
 Naco Municipality - northeast
 Fronteras Municipality - east
 Bacoachi Municipality - southeast
 Arizpe Municipality - south
 Ímuris Municipality - southwest
 Santa Cruz Municipality - northwest
 Cochise County, Arizona - north

Economic activity
Mining is still very important, with copper mines in the municipal seat.  Cattle raising is also widely practiced.  The main agricultural products are corn, beans, barley, sorghum, alfalfa, and apples.

In the municipal seat there are manufacturing companies that operate under the system called maquila, assembling products for re-export to the United States.

Government

The current Mayor of Cananea is Jesus Reginaldo Moreno Garcia, a member of the Institutional Revolutionary Party (PRI), and his term expires in 2012. He is a retired teacher.

References

External links
  Enciclopedia de los Municipios de México

Populated places established in 1901
Municipalities of Sonora